Frances Noel may refer to:
 Frances Nacke Noel, women's labor activist and suffragette
 Frances Noel, Countess of Gainsborough, Lady of the Bedchamber to Queen Victoria